Jane Mary Dealy (1856 – 1939), known as Lady Lewis from 1904, was an English artist of the later nineteenth and early twentieth centuries. She was noted for her pictures of children, and was a successful illustrator of children's books.

Born in Liverpool, she was educated at the Slade School and the Royal Academy Schools; at the latter, she won the 1880 first prize for best drawing (a silver medal and £10). She showed her works at the Royal Academy shows and at the Institute of Painters of Water Colours. She married Walter Lewis in 1887; after his knighthood, she was known as Lady Lewis.

The children's books she illustrated included The Land of Little People, Sixes and Sevens, Children's Hymns,  Children's Prayers, and The Easy-to-Read Storybook.

Dealy exhibited her work at the Palace of Fine Arts at the 1893 World's Columbian Exposition in Chicago, Illinois.

References

External links

1856 births
1939 deaths
19th-century English painters
19th-century English women artists
20th-century English painters
20th-century English women artists
Alumni of the Royal Academy Schools
Alumni of the Slade School of Fine Art
Artists from Liverpool
British children's book illustrators
British women illustrators
English women painters
Wives of knights